Bythotiaridae is a family of cnidarians belonging to the order Anthoathecata.

Genera

Genera:
 Brinckmannia Schuchert & Reiswig, 2006
 Bythocellata Nair, 1951
 Bythothiara Günther, 1903

References

Filifera
Cnidarian families